Tomo Riba Institute of Health and Medical Sciences is the first medical college of Arunachal Pradesh situated at Naharlagun town of Papum Pare district. The institute is established in 2017 and the academic session started on 1 August 2018 for academic year 2018–19. The Tomo Riba Institute of Health and Medical Sciences college and hospital have 50 MBBS seats and a 300 bedded hospital.

The Institute is named after Tomo Riba, 2nd chief minister of Arunachal Pradesh.

TRIHMS offers undergraduate and postgraduate courses in various medical and health sciences disciplines, including MBBS, B.Sc. Nursing, M.Sc. Nursing, and MD/MS in various specialties.

The institute also has a strong research focus, with ongoing research projects in various medical and health sciences fields.

References

Universities and colleges in Arunachal Pradesh
Medical colleges in Arunachal Pradesh
Educational Institutions in Arunachal Pradesh
Educational institutions established in 2017
2017 establishments in Arunachal Pradesh